Irena Netto (19 October 1899 – 13 March 1992) was a Polish actress. She appeared in 34 films between 1947 and 1969.

Selected filmography
 Farewells (1958)
 Samson (1961)
 Rozstanie (1961)

References

External links

1899 births
1992 deaths
Polish film actresses
People from Dąbrowa Górnicza